The Salaat are Muslim community found in the state of Gujarat in India. They are Muslim converts from the Hindu Salaat caste.

History and Origins

The name Salaat is a derivative of the Aramaic word saliya meaning stone. Their traditional occupation was stone cutting. The community originated in Sindh and migrated to Jalore in Rajasthan. In the 16th Century, the Nawab of Palanpur invited a few Salaats to work in his quarries. They are found mainly in Palanpur, with small numbers in Ahmedabad and Baroda. The community speak Gujarati, with substantial Marwari loanwords. The community are distantly related to the Silawat community of Rajasthan.

Present circumstances

The Salat are an endogamous community, with marriages arranged with a close kin. In addition to stone cutting, the community are also masons, involved in the building of mosques and temples. Many Salat are now petty traders or building contractors.  Like other Gujarati Muslims, they have a communal organization referred to as a jamat. The Salat Muslim Jamat is their principle community organization, and deals with issues of welfare.

See also

Silawat

References

Social groups of Gujarat
Muslim communities of India
Muslim communities of Gujarat